Mughal carpets (Moghul or Mogul carpets) were the handwoven floor coverings used in the Mughal Empire in their courts. Mughal carpets and rugs have their roots in India since the 16th and 17th centuries. Mughal carpets were a blend of Persian and Indian artistry uniquely designed with scenic landscapes, floral, and animal patterns. Kashmir was producing the finest wool and silk carpets and rugs, including prayer rugs. Sometimes the knot density in these rugs was so fine and tight as 300 knots per square centimeter.

The Mughal emperors were enthusiastic about textile materials, especially the third Mughal emperor Akbar who set numerous imperial workshops across India. He also arranged training of local artisans to improve the skill. In addition to textile, the manufacturing of carpets was an important industry. .

Production 
Mughal carpet weaving was renowned in Agra, Lahore, and Fatehpur Sikri. The karkhanas of carpet, rugs, tents, and various other floor coverings was called Farrash khana.

Creativity 
The Mughal empress Nur Jahan had a personal interest in textiles. Her name is associated with designing many fabrics and dresses, and there is also a carpet named Farshi-Chandni that became well-known during her time.

Special Mentions 
The Girdler's carpet is one of the best-documented examples of Mughul carpets.

See also 
Girdler's carpet

Mughal Karkhanas

References 

Mughal art
Indian rugs and carpets